Invercargill is an electorate of the New Zealand Parliament that has existed since 1866.

Population centres
The electorate covers Invercargill city and the surrounding rural area, including Stewart Island / Rakiura. In 1996 a boundary redistribution resulted in the abolition of the Awarua electorate and merged with Invercargill following re-drawing of boundaries due to the introduction of mixed-member proportional voting (MMP). Minor but steady population decline in the Southland region has generally resulted in Invercargill expanding northwards. The 2013 redistribution, however, has left Invercargill unchanged. The 2020 redistribution added a large area around Clifden and Tuatapere.

History
The electorate was established in 1866 when it separated from the Wallace electorate.

Wood retired at the end of the parliamentary term in 1870. The resulting  was won by John Cuthbertson, who served until the end of the parliamentary term in 1875.

Cuthbertson was defeated by George Lumsden in the 1875 election. Henry Feldwick was the successful candidate and he commenced his first of three terms for the electorate.

Kelly became a member of the Liberal Party and served for three parliamentary terms, but broke away from the Liberal Party and became an Independent Liberal in 1895. Hanan served the electorate until 1925, when he retired.

The  was narrowly won by the former Prime Minister Sir Joseph Ward standing for the Liberal Party, who beat James Hargest of the Reform Party with 4957 votes to 4798; a third contender, Patrick Hickey, stood for the Labour Party. Until 1919, Ward had for many years represented Awarua. Ward, a former leader of the Liberal Party, contested the election under the "Liberal" label, despite the fact that the remnants of the Liberal Party were now calling themselves by different names. He died on 8 July 1930, which caused the  won by his son Vincent Ward, who retired at the end of the parliamentary term in 1931.

At the end of the parliamentary term in 1935, Hargest successfully contested the Awarua electorate. Hanan was re-elected seven times and died in office on 24 July 1969; the need to hold a by-election before the general election on 29 November was avoided by a special act, the By-election Postponement Act 1969.

At the next election in 1975, Munro was in turn beaten by National's Norman Jones. Jones retired at the end of his fourth term in August 1987 and died shortly thereafter on 19 November.

Members of Parliament
Key

List MPs
Members of Parliament elected from party lists in elections where that person also unsuccessfully contested the Invercargill electorate. Unless otherwise stated, all MPs terms began and ended at general elections.

Election results

2020 election

2017 election

2014 election

2011 election

Electorate (as at 26 November 2011): 45,014

2008 election

2005 election

2002 election

1999 election

1996 election

1993 election

1990 election

1987 election

1984 election

1981 election

1978 election

1975 election

1972 election

1969 election

1966 election

1963 election

1960 election

1957 election

1954 election

1951 election

1949 election

1946 election

1943 election

1938 election

1935 election

1931 election

1930 by-election

1928 election

1925 election

1899 election

1896 election

1893 election

1890 election

1878 by-election

1875 election

1873 by-election

1871 election

1866 election

Table footnotes

Notes

References

New Zealand electorates
Politics of Southland, New Zealand
1865 establishments in New Zealand